Salehieh, until 30 January 2013, Salehabad, is a city in Golestan District of Baharestan County, Tehran province, Iran. At the 2006 census, its population was 54,218 in 13,454 households, when it was in Robat Karim County. The following census in 2011 counted 56,356 people in 15,417 households, by which time the district, together with Bostan District, had been separated from the county and Baharestan County established. The latest census in 2016 showed a population of 58,683 people in 17,372 households.

References

Cities in Tehran Province
Populated places in Baharestan County